John Abyn (by 1523 – 1558 or 1559), of Salisbury, Wiltshire, was an English politician.

Career
Abyn was a Member of Parliament for Salisbury in October 1553 and April 1554.

References

Year of birth missing
1558 deaths
1559 deaths
16th-century births
People from Salisbury
English MPs 1553 (Mary I)
English MPs 1554